Kuk Swamp is an archaeological site in Papua New Guinea, that lies in the Wahgi Valley of the highlands. The swamp developed in a former lake basin, as it was filled by an alluvial fan or deposits of water-transported material. Archaeological evidence for early agricultural drainage systems was found here, beginning about 9,000 years ago. It includes draining ditches of three major classes, which were used to convert the area to an anthropogenic grassland. The native crop taro was grown here. 

In addition, evidence of cultivation of bananas and sugar cane has been found, estimated to have begun 6,900 – 6,400 years ago. The Kuk Swamp was recognized in 2008 as a World Heritage Site by UNESCO. It was one of the places in the world where people independently developed agriculture.

Background
The Kuk creek is believed to flow through the entirety of the fan to a catchment in the lower hills of the south region. Some channels were built to carry the water past the reach of the fan. If these channels were blocked, as evidence suggests, the area would develop as a swamp, diverting the water into smaller distributary channels. Evidence for early agricultural drainage systems was found here, beginning about 9,000 years ago. Features such as pits, postholes, and runnels have been found at the site, indicating evidence of early agriculture. Such features are consistent with planting, digging and tethering of plants. 

In addition, evidence has been found of irrigation draining ditches, dating back to 9,000 years ago. A number of plants, including taro were grown, at what would have been the edge of its cultivable limit in the highlands. These ditches can be divided into three types: major disposal channels, large field ditches, and small field ditches. The major disposal channels were built to divert water from the fan flowing south and direct them toward the northeast areas. The large and small field ditches are more uniform, surrounding the perimeter of the planting areas. They connect with the major disposal channels. During this time, the people of Kuk Swamp transformed their landscape into an anthropogenic grassland suitable for agriculture.

During archaeological excavation of the drainage channels, researchers found artefacts including wooden digging sticks, a grindstone, and other small items. The ditches were cleaned out, and a small trench was dug to study the different layers of clay used to construct the ditches. These different layers suggest that the ditches were deliberately constructed by people. 

Dated to 6,900 – 6,400 years ago, additional archaeobotanical evidence has been found showing the cultivation of bananas and sugar cane. Many banana phytoliths have been found in the cultivation plots of Kuk Swamp. Since bananas do not produce phytoliths in the same quantity and frequency as grass and other plants, researchers have concluded that the abundance of banana phytoliths found in a managed grassed landscape between 6950 and 6550 years ago suggests deliberate planting. The bananas grown at Kuk Swamp were Eumusa bananas, which developed as the most significant and largest group of banana domesticates. This makes Kuk Swamp one of the earliest sites in the world for the development of agriculture.

In 2008, Kuk Swamp was listed as a World Heritage Site by UNESCO.

See also
Indigenous people of New Guinea
Austronesian peoples
Domesticated plants and animals of Austronesia

References

Bibliography
 Golson, J., T.P. Denham, P.J. Hughes, P. Swadling and J. Muke (eds.) 2017. Ten Thousand Years of Cultivation at Kuk Swamp in the Highlands of Papua New Guinea. Terra Australis 46. Canberra: ANU E Press (available online)

 Bayliss-Smith, T, Golson, J, Hughes, P et al 2005, 'Archaeological evidence for the Ipomoean Revolution at Kuk swamp, upper Wahgi Valley, Papua New Guinea', in Chris Ballard, Paula Brown, R. Michael Bourke and Tracy Harwood (ed.), The Sweet Potato in Oceania: a reappraisal, Oceania Publications and University of Pittsburgh, Rosebery, NSW, Australia, pp. 109-120.

Denham, T, Golson, J & Hughes, P 2004, 'Reading early agriculture at Kuk Swamp, Wahgi Valley, Papua New Guinea: the archaeological features (phases 1-3)', Proceedings of the Prehistoric Society, vol. 70, pp. 259-97.

 Muke, J. Mandui, H. Oct 2003. "In the shadows of Kuk: Evidence of prehistoric agriculture at Kana, Wahgi Valley, Papua New Guinea," Archaeology in Oceania. 38, 3, pp.177–185.

 Bayliss-Smith, T. Golson, J. April 1992. "A colocasian revolution in the New Guinea highlands? Insights from phase 4 at Kuk," Archaeology in Oceania. 27,1, pp.1–22.

External links 
 National Geo article
 List
 Data

History of Papua New Guinea
Western Highlands Province
Archaeological sites in Papua New Guinea
World Heritage Sites in Papua New Guinea